Ly Vahed ( born 16 August 1998) is a Cambodian footballer who plays as a defender for Boeung Ket and the Cambodia national football team.

International career
He made his debut in a friendly match against Saudi Arabia national football team on 14 January 2017

Honours

Club
Boeung Ket
 Cambodian League: 2016, 2017
 2015 Mekong Club Championship: Runner up

References

External links
 

Living people
Cambodia international footballers
1998 births
Cambodian footballers
Association football defenders
People from Kampong Cham province